James David Jentsch (born April 9, 1972) is an American neuroscientist. He is the Empire Innovation Professor of Psychology at Binghamton University. His research considers the neurobiological origins of psychoses and addiction. Jentsch was awarded the 2011 AAAS Award for Scientific Freedom and Responsibility.

Early life and education 
Jentsch was born on April 9, 1972, in Seguin, Texas. He studied behavioural biology at Johns Hopkins University. He moved to Yale University for his graduate studies, where he specialised in neurobiology. Here he worked on the biochemical changes associated with the abuse of psychotomimetic and stimulant drugs. He completed his doctoral research under the supervision of Robert Henry Roth. Jentsch was a postdoctoral scholar at the University of Pittsburgh, where he worked in the department of neuroscience.

Research and career 
Jentsch joined the University of California, Los Angeles in 2001. He was promoted to Associate Professor in 2007, and Associate Director of the Brain Research Institute and Professor in 2009. In 2009 Jentsch woke up to find that his car had been firebombed by animal rights activists. The firebombing was one of a series of attacks against UCLA researchers, criticising Jentsch's use of animals in his research on schizophrenia. The following summer Jentsch was on the receiving end of several violent threats from Camille Marino, who told Jentsch that the thought of his death amused her "immensely". Jentsch founded UCLA Pro-Test, a group that looked to take on the alleged misinformation shared by animal rights activists and tackle violent extremism.

Jentsch was made Empire Innovation Professor of Psychology at Binghamton University in 2015. His research looks to establish the neural and genetic mechanisms that underpin alcohol and drug addiction.

At Binghamton Jentsch was awarded a $11,700,000 grant from the National Institute on Drug Abuse to investigate cocaine addiction, and the neural pathways that can result in someone becoming addicted. Jentsch is interested in identifying the genes that can predispose people to drug addiction, as this may be able to inform life-saving interventions.

Jentsch serves on the advisory board of the Lifeboat Foundation.

Awards and honours 
 2009 UCLA Department of Psychology Distinguished Teaching Award
 2011 UCLA Department of Psychology Distinguished Service Award
 2011  Society for Neuroscience Jacob P. Waletzky Memorial Award
 2011 AAAS Award for Scientific Freedom and Responsibility
 2014 Elected to the American College of Neuropsychopharmacology
 2014 California Biomedical Research Association Leadership Award

Selected publications

Personal life 
Jentsch is openly gay and is part of the organisation 500 Queer Scientists. He uses social media including Twitter to share his research and experiences as a scientist.

References 

American LGBT scientists
1972 births
People from Seguin, Texas
Binghamton University faculty
Yale University alumni
Johns Hopkins University alumni
David Geffen School of Medicine at UCLA faculty
American neuroscientists
Living people
Gay academics
Gay scientists
Scientists from Texas
20th-century American scientists
21st-century American scientists